Self-adhesive plastic could mean:

 Self-adhesive plastic sheet, a wide sheet material used for decorative purposes
 Pressure-sensitive tape, a narrow tape used typically for functional purposes